Hall Mead School is a coeducational secondary school with academy status, located in Cranham area of the London Borough of Havering, England.

Faculty 
The Head Master is Mr. Simon London (Hons.). He was educated at St. Martins School in Essex, and Lancaster University.

General Information 
Hall Mead School is designated as a Leading Edge Specialist Academy in Technology and Languages by the Department of Education. It is also the lead school in a teacher training consortium.

History 
Hall Mead School opened in 1960. It was originally a secondary modern school for those who were not selected to go to Grammar School by examination at the age of 11 years. It is now a comprehensive school. Well-equipped, it was one of the first schools to acquire a swimming pool, largely by the fundraising efforts of the pupils and their families. However, Hall Mead does not currently have a swimming pool to the present day.

The Hall Mead School converted into an academy in 2011.

In 2013, it was the only school in Havering to receive an 'Outstanding' report from Ofsted, in the terms of Achievement of pupils, Quality of teaching, Behaviour & safety of pupils as well as Leadership & Management, while other nearby schools such as Coopers' Company and Coborn School and Gaynes School only managed to get a 'Good' report. Currently, construction is underway for a brand new school with modern aspects designed to innovate the learning experiences of pupils. The build is expected to be complete by  2021.

Notable Former Pupils 
Frankie Sandford Singer: S Club 8 and The Saturdays. Runner up on Strictly Come Dancing in 2013
Harlee Dean Footballer for Birmingham City F.C.
Carly Hillman Actress and stage performer who was in EastEnders
James Smith Britain's Got Talent (series 8) Finalist 
Amy Marren Paralympian
Paul Sculfor Model
Phil Mison DJ
Max Watters Footballer

Location 
It is located in the north side of Upminster, next to Cranham.

References 

Academies in the London Borough of Havering
Secondary schools in the London Borough of Havering
Educational institutions established in 1960
1960 establishments in England